Louis Michel François Doyère (born 28 January 1811 in Saint-Michel-des-Essartiers, Calvados; died 1863 in Corsica) was a French zoologist and agronomist.

References
Philippe Jaussaud & Édouard R. Brygoo (2004). Du Jardin au Muséum en 516 biographies. Muséum national d’histoire naturelle de Paris : 630 p. 

1811 births
1863 deaths
19th-century French zoologists
French agronomists